Dominic Stricker was the defending champion, but was no longer eligible to participate in junior events.

Luca Van Assche won the title, defeating Arthur Fils in the final, 6–4, 6–2.

This was the first Grand Slam junior tournament with all-French semifinalists.

Seeds

Draw

Finals

Top half

Section 1

Section 2

Bottom half

Section 3

Section 4

External links 
Draw at rolandgarros.com
Draw at ITFtennis.com

References

Boys' Singles
2021